Sphaerodactylus savagei, also known commonly as the Altagracia speckled sphaero or Savage's least gecko, is a small species of lizard in the family Sphaerodactylidae. The species is endemic to the Dominican Republic.

Etymology
The specific name, savagei, is in honour of American herpetologist Jay M. Savage.

Habitat
The preferred habitats of S. savagei are rocky areas and forests at altitudes of

Reproduction
S. savagei is oviparous.

Subspecies
Two subspecies are recognized as being valid, including the nominotypical subspecies.
Sphaerodactylus savagei juanilloensis 
Sphaerodactylus savagei savagei

References

Further reading
Rösler H (2000), "Kommentierte Liste der rezent, subrezent und fossil bekannten Geckotaxa (Reptilia: Gekkonomorpha)". Gekkota 2: 28–153. (Sphaerodactylus savagei, p. 114). (in German).
Schwartz A, Henderson RW (1991). Amphibians and Reptiles of the West Indies: Descriptions, Distributions, and Natural History. Gainesville, Florida: University of Florida Press. 720 pp. . (Sphaerodactylus savagei, p. 532).
Schwartz A, Thomas R (1975). A Check-list of West Indian Amphibians and Reptiles. Carnegie Museum of Natural History Special Publication No. 1. Pittsburgh, Pennsylvania: Carnegie Museum of Natural History. 216 pp. (Sphaerodactylus savagei, new status, p. 161; S. savagei juanilloensis, new combination, p. 161).
Shreve B (1968). "The notatus group of Sphaerodactylus (Sauria, Gekkonidae) in Hispaniola". Breviora (280): 1-28. (Sphaerodactylus notatus savagei, new subspecies, pp. 7–8; S. n. juanilloensis, new subspecies, p. 8).

Sphaerodactylus
Endemic fauna of the Dominican Republic
Reptiles of the Dominican Republic
Reptiles described in 1968
Taxa named by Benjamin Shreve